The English Ice Hockey Association (EIHA) is the governing body of ice hockey in England and Wales. It was formed in 1982 and featured around 60 teams. EIHA is one of several bodies regulating ice hockey in the United Kingdom, along with Scottish Ice Hockey (SIH), the Northern Ireland Ice Hockey Association (IHNI), and Ice Hockey UK, which governs the national ice hockey teams of Great Britain as a national member of the International Ice Hockey Association (IIHF). In 2016, support for uniting the associations under one central organization has been expressed by heads of each of the various organizations, but, as of 2020, there are no actionable plans to be executed in the near future.

Responsibilities
The leagues and areas for which the EIHA are responsible for are:
National Ice Hockey League (NIHL)
Women's National Ice Hockey League (WNIHL)
National Team Programme (NTP), a training and development programme for junior players, also called “Team England”
British Universities Ice Hockey Association
Recreational ice hockey

The EIHA is also responsible for conducting courses on coaching as well as managing the training and registration of on- and off-ice officials.

References

External links
English Ice Hockey Association official website

 
England
Ice hockey governing bodies in the United Kingdom
Organisations based in Lancashire
Sports organizations established in 1982
Sport in Blackpool
1982 establishments in England